Harford Glen Environmental Education Center is a division of Harford County Public Schools and is involved in environmental and elementary education.  The park, which is open to the public during the summer and on weekends is located on Winters Run.  Harford Glen was also the host of the 13th annual Maryland Envirothon state level event in 2002.

References

External links
 Official Harford Glen Environmental Education Center Website
 Additional site

Harford County Public Schools
Bel Air, Harford County, Maryland
Education in Harford County, Maryland
Nature centers in Maryland
Protected areas of Harford County, Maryland